Xinhua Township is a township of Yuanmou County in north-central Yunnan province, China, located about  due west of the county seat and  north-northeast of Chuxiong City as the crow flies. , it has four villages under its administration.

References 

Township-level divisions of Chuxiong Yi Autonomous Prefecture